Oenochrominae is a subfamily of the moth family Geometridae.

Genera

References

External links

 
Geometridae
Moth subfamilies